Amamoma is a community in the Cape Coast Municipality in the Central Region of Ghana. It is located around the University of Cape Coast. In 2016, the Chief of Amamoma was Nana Yartel III.

Institution 

 Imam Khomeini Islamic Basic School

References 

Central Region (Ghana)
Communities in Ghana